Allylguaiacol may refer to:

 4-Allylguaiacol (eugenol)
 5-Allylguaiacol (chavibetol)